The 1898 Add-Ran Christian football team represented Add-Ran Christian University—now known as Texas Christian University (TCU)—as an independent during the 1898 college football season. They played their home games in Waco, Texas.

Schedule

References

Add-Ran Christian
TCU Horned Frogs football seasons
Add-Ran Christian football